Antonio de Viti de Marco (30 September 1858 – 1 December 1943)  was an Italian economist. Born in Lecce, he was professor of public finance in Rome from 1887 until 1931, when he resigned rather than take an oath of loyalty to the Italian fascism regime. He was a longtime editor of the Giornale degli Economisti. He has been described as "an unyielding defender of liberalism". His writings on public goods, taxation and public debt set the foundation for modern theories of public choice.

References

Bibliography
 
 
 

1858 births
1943 deaths
Italian classical liberals
Italian economists
Public choice theory
Giornale degli economisti e annali di economia editors